Moen is a village in Risør municipality in Agder county, Norway. The Norwegian County Road 416 runs through the village.

References

Villages in Agder
Risør